is a Japanese professional wrestling, boxing and mixed martial arts-themed steak house restaurant with two locations. The original location is in Gotanda, and there is a second, larger location in Shimomeguro. Professional wrestlers frequent the restaurant when touring in Tokyo, a rite of passage in the wrestling community. In addition, some wrestlers receive a complimentary satin Ribera Steakhouse Jacket from the owners.

History

Chris Jericho credits wrestler Stan Hansen with "discovering" the restaurant in the 1970s. Hansen, however, credits Bruiser Brody with being the first American wrestler to discover the restaurant. In the late 1970s and early 1980s, American professional wrestlers began to frequent the restaurant when they were wrestling in Tokyo. Over time, the owner began to cover the walls with hundreds of pictures of the wrestlers who ate at his restaurant. The owner rotates the pictures to correlate with the wrestlers currently touring the country. The restaurant is also decorated with other sorts of memorabilia such as title belts and trophies.

The owners of Ribera Steakhouse give out the Ribera Steakhouse Jacket to selected patrons. The jacket is satin and has a bull logo on the breast. Road Warrior Animal popularized wearing the jacket with Zubaz pants. Later, it became a rite of passage for American wrestlers to go to the steakhouse and receive their own jacket. Ricky Fuji has said that in English Ribera means, "I'm a wrestler, and I've been to Japan."

The restaurant features New York-style steaks in three sizes—1/2 pound, 1 pound, and 1 1/2 pounds—and sides such as corn, rice, salad, and soup. There is also a Ribera Akebono eating challenge. The challenger must eat 1.35 kilograms of steak and several side dishes in under 30 minutes to win 10,000 yen (approximately US$73 as of June 2022).

A second and bigger location was built in Shimomeguro, and it is run by the original location's owner's son.

See also

Professional wrestling in Japan
Dropkick Bar

References

External links

Ribera Steakhouse at Nortega.com

Steakhouses
Sports-themed restaurants
Restaurants in Tokyo
Martial arts culture
Wrestling culture